Cymus elegans is a species of bugs in the family Lygaeidae. It is found in Korea.

References

External links 

 Cymus elegans at insectoid.info
 specimen IBERZCXX0193 at the National Museum of Natural History, Sofia, Bulgaria

Insects described in 1978
Lygaeidae
Fauna of Korea